Robert H. Robinson Library was one of the earliest libraries for Colored People in the United States, during the Jim Crow laws era. Robert Robinson Library was located at 902 Wythe St., Alexandria, Virginia, and was operated since 1940 by the City of Alexandria.

History
The library was named in honor of Rev. Robert H. Robinson, an African American minister, educator, and activist. He was the grandson of Caroline Branham, a enslaved women held by George and Martha Washington.

In 1939 sit-in at the new and "whites only" Alexandria, Virginia public library (Kate Waller Barret branch) organized by the lawyer Samuel Wilbert Tucker since the library's budget was collected from the taxes paid by every American citizen.

The original goal of Lawyer Samuel Wilbert Tucker was to allow African Americans to use Virginia's Public Library, but instead of it was built a small and segregated library—Robert Robinson Library. Its construction was completed in 1940 and functioned as the first "separate but equal" library for African Americans in the segregated city.

Librarians and collection

Since the time of its foundation, its staff was formed by professional librarians who graduated from many American universities and the books were served to students of different levels from kindergarten up to university.

Importance

The city's project followed a 1939 sit-in by African Americans and arrests at the whites-only Alexandria Library.

The 1939 event is commonly cited as the first non-violent protest by African Americans against racial segregation.

Current status 

Since the libraries were desegregated, Robert H. Robinson Library became part of the Alexandria Black History Museum.

The museum has changing exhibitions on local and national topics related to African Americans.

The museum also operates the Alexandria African American Heritage Park, a  park at 500 Holland Lane, which contains a  nineteenth-century African-American cemetery that was buried under a city landfill in the 1960s.

See also

 Contrabands and Freedmen Cemetery
 Franklin and Armfield Office
 Alexandria Black History Museum
 Frederick Douglass National Historic Site
 National Museum of African American History and Culture
 National Museum of African Art
 Anacostia Community Museum
 Founders Library
 List of museums focused on African Americans

Further reading

External links
 Official Web site of the Alexandria Black History Museum

References

Museums in Alexandria, Virginia
African-American history of Virginia
Buildings and structures in Alexandria, Virginia
Cemeteries in Alexandria, Virginia
Tourist attractions in Alexandria, Virginia
African-American museums in Virginia
Parks in Alexandria, Virginia